Ohkochigawa Dam is a gravity dam located in Yamaguchi prefecture in Japan. The dam is used for flood control and water supply. The catchment area of the dam is 12.4 km2. The dam impounds about 23  ha of land when full and can store 4190 thousand cubic meters of water. The construction of the dam was started on 1975.

References

Dams in Yamaguchi Prefecture
1975 establishments in Japan